The Limburg-Staffel–Siershahn railway is a railway line between Limburg-Staffel, Montabaur and Siershahn in the Westerwald. The line, which is also known as the Unterwesterwaldbahn (Lower Westerwald Railway), runs through the German states of Rhineland-Palatinate and Hesse.

History

The Rhenish Railway Company (Rheinische Eisenbahn-Gesellschaft, RhE) planned the line and also received the concession to build it. It was opened to Staffel on 30 May 1884, by which time the Prussian state railways had taken over operations of the RhE. The Prussian government took control of the RhE on 1 January 1886.

The Lower Westerwald Railway connected to the Hadamar–Limburg line in Staffel. The Lower Westerwald Railway connected with the Brexbach Valley Railway (Brexbachtalbahn), which connected to the East Rhine Railway (Rechte Rheinstrecke) in Siershahn.

Operations

While the Deutsche Bundesbahn ceased passenger services on the Holzbach Valley Railway on 1 June 1984, it continued to operate services on the Lower Westerwald Railway. Since 12 December 2004, services have been operated by Vectus Verkehrsgesellschaft every hour or every two hours using LINT diesel multiple units.

The modern Montabaur station was opened in 2002 to provide interchange with the Cologne-Frankfurt high-speed railway.

Due to an accident at a level crossing near Girod on 30 September 2011, the line was severely damaged over a length of 7 km to Montabaur. During the period required for its repair, a steam-hauled freight train of the Hanau railway museum (Museumseisenbahn Hanau) railway ran over the Taunus to Steinefrenz station to supply the concrete sleepers. After the restoration of the line, services were resumed on 19 October 2011.

Notes

Railway lines in Rhineland-Palatinate
Railway lines in Hesse
Westerwald
Railway lines opened in 1884
1884 establishments in Germany